Batroun (Christian and    "the Cleft") is a coastal city in northern Lebanon and one of the oldest continuously inhabited cities in the world. It is the capital city of Batroun District.

Etymology 

Batroun appears in Western Aramaic, and is attested in as bṯrwn in premodern Arabic texts, with the expected lenition of t for an Aramaic term. Elie Mardini suggests the shift of the th to t in Aramaic terms in the Levant is due to the merger of certain fricatives in Levantine Arabic.

Economy and urban development 
Historically, the city of Batroun was settled at the interface between the sea and the national road that connected Beirut to Tripoli.

Lately, the radical shift of the historical functions of the local economic tissue into a leisure service-based economy (nightclubs, bars, restaurants, stores, etc.) has become the unique and only lever of the development of the city. The economic metamorphosis has resulted in the resettlement of housing towards emerging city suburbs (nearby hills: New Batroun, Batroun Hills, Basbina, etc.) consequently to the overvaluation of the real estate market in the city centre.
It clearly reveals here the constitution of a business city-centre (dedicated to leisure and business) balanced by the constitution of residential suburbs, where accelerated urban sprawl has led to the destruction of natural lands (pinewood and orange groves) and to the fatal rise in land prices.

Tourism 

Batroun is a major tourist destination in North Lebanon. The town boasts  historic Maronite and Greek Orthodox churches. The town is also a major beach resort with a vibrant nightlife that includes pubs and nightclubs. Citrus groves surround Batroun, and the town has been famous (from the early twentieth century) for its fresh lemonade sold at the cafés and restaurants on its main street. Biking along the Batroun coastline is also a major activity namely in late summer days.
In 2009, the Batroun International Festival was born. It began hosting leading local and international artists. The festival takes place usually in July and/or August of each year in the old harbor area.

Demography 
The people of Batroun are mainly Maronite, Melkite, and Greek Orthodox Christians. Batroun is a Roman Catholic (Latin rite) Titular See.

History 
Batroun is likely the "Batruna" mentioned in the Amarna letters dating to the 14th century B.C. Batroun was mentioned by the ancient geographers Strabo, Pliny, Ptolemy, Stephanus of Byzantium, and Hierocles. Theophanes the Confessor called the city "Bostrys."

The Phoenicians founded Batroun on the southern side of the promontory called in classical antiquity Theoprosopon and during the Byzantine Empire, Cape Lithoprosopon. Batroun is said to have been founded by Ithobaal I (Ethbaal), king of Tyre, whose daughter Jezabel (897–866 B.C.) married Ahab.

The city was under Roman rule to Phoenice Province, and later after the region was Christianized became a suffragan of the Patriarch of Antioch.

In 551, Batroun was destroyed by an earthquake,  which also caused mudslides and made the Cape Lithoprosopon  crack.  Historians believe that Batroun's large natural harbor was formed during the earthquake.

Three Greek Orthodox bishops are known to have come from Batroun: Porphyrius in 451, Elias about 512 and Stephen in 553 (Lequien, II, 827). According to a Greek Notitia episcopatuum, the Greek Orthodox See has existed in Batroun since the tenth century when the city was then called Petrounion. After the Muslim conquests of the region, the name was Arabicized to Batroun.

Batroun was controlled by the Crusaders in 1104, to be known as the Lordship of Botrun as part of the County of Tripoli, until it was conquered by the Mamluk Sultanate in 1289. One of Batroun's archaeological sites is Mseilha Fort, which is constructed on an isolated massive rock with steep sides protruding in the middle of a plain surrounded by mountains.

Under Ottoman rule, Batroun was the centre of a kaza in the mutessariflik of Lebanon and the seat of a Maronite diocese, suffragan to the Maronite Catholic Patriarchate of Antioch. Since 1999, it has been the seat of the Maronite eparchy.

Politics 
Elections, municipal and parliamentary, in Batroun have seen increasing interest, namely in the context of local and national struggle for power. The current serving Mayor of Batroun is Marcelino El Harek.

Landmarks 

 The Ancient Sea Wall  
 El-Bahsa beach  
 Makaad El Mir
 El-Mseilha Fort 
 St. Stephan's Cathedral  
 Historic Souk

References 

Citations

External links 

 Ortmtlb.org.lb
 Batroun.com

Batroun District
Coloniae (Roman)
Mediterranean port cities and towns in Lebanon
Populated coastal places in Lebanon
Populated places in the North Governorate
Phoenician cities
Phoenician sites in Lebanon
Hellenistic colonies
Crusader churches
Tourist attractions in Lebanon
Tourism in Lebanon
Christian cities in Lebanon
Maronite Christian communities in Lebanon